Gabriel Johansson (born 10 September 2000) is a Swedish football defender who plays for Falkenbergs FF.

References

2000 births
Living people
Swedish footballers
Association football defenders
Falkenbergs FF players
Allsvenskan players